Nilavu Suduvathillai is a 1984 Indian Tamil-language film, directed by K. Rangaraj and produced by S. M. G. Mani and T. N. R. The film stars Sivakumar, Raadhika in dual role, N. Viswanathan and V. Gopalakrishnan.

Plot 
Ravi falls in love with Radhika. Soon his love turns to sadness when he learns that she is his boss's daughter, masquerading as an ordinary girl only to assess his suitability as her partner.

Cast 

Sivakumar
Raadhika
N. Viswanathan
V. Gopalakrishnan
Goundamani
Kallapetti Singaram
Ramanathan
Usilaimani
Paranjothi
Kullamani
Parthasarathy
Cenchi Krishnan
Muthu Bharathi
Pushpalatha
Arundhathi
Y. Vijaya
Gemini Rajeswari
Sathya

Soundtrack 
The music was composed by Ilaiyaraaja.

References

External links 
 

|}

1984 films
1980s Tamil-language films
Films scored by Ilaiyaraaja
Films directed by K. Rangaraj